James W. "Rabbit" Bradshaw was an American football player and coach.  He served as the head football coach at Fresno State College—now known as California State University, Fresno—from 1936 to 1942 and again in 1946, compiling a record of 59–18–5.  Bradshaw played college football at the University of Nevada.  He began his coaching career at Galileo High School—now known as Galileo Academy of Science and Technology—in San Francisco before moving to Stanford University in 1928 as backfield coach.  Bradshaw was considered for the position of head football coach at the University of Oregon in January 1938.

Bradshaw was inducted into the Fresno County Athletic Hall of Fame in 1964.

Head coaching record

College

Notes

References

Year of birth missing
Year of death missing
American football halfbacks
Fresno State Bulldogs football coaches
Nevada Wolf Pack football players
Stanford Cardinal football coaches
High school football coaches in California